The Puerto Rico Department of Agriculture is one of the few Cabinet-level government agencies explicitly created by the Constitution of Puerto Rico as the Department of "Agriculture and Commerce", most of the commerce at the time of its enactment being agriculture-based. The DAC oversees rural development work and conservation and is headed by a cabinet secretary. The current secretary is Ramón González Beiró who was confirmed in May 2021.

History
Prior to the Constitution, according to law 60 of April 25, 1940, it was known as Department of Agriculture. The most recent reorganization of government responsibilities concerning the department come from Law No. 4 of 2010.

The purpose of DAPR is to:
 Support agricultural production, commercial fishing, and aquaculture to ensure fair prices and stable markets for producers and consumers;
 Work to improve and maintain farm income; and
 Help to develop and expand markets abroad for agricultural products.

Activities

DAPR administers rural development, credit, and conservation programs that are designed to implement national growth policies, and it conducts scientific and technological research in all areas of agriculture. Through its inspection and grading services, DAPR ensures standards of quality in food offered for sale.

Throughout the years, the department's name has been modified, as well as its structure, but today remains a separate structure with additional agencies and public corporations as part of the Department of Agriculture "umbrella".

The department is headed by a cabinet secretary, appointed by the Governor of Puerto Rico and subject to the advice and consent of the Senate of Puerto Rico. The current incumbent is Ramón González Beiró.

Secretaries

 Miguel Hernandez Agosto
 Antonio González Chapell
 Carlos López Nieves
 Javier Rivera Aquino
 Justo A. Méndez Rodriguez
 2012–2013: Neftalí Soto
 2013: Myrna Comas Pagan 
 Ramón González Beiró 2021-present

References

Agriculture in Puerto Rico

Executive departments of the government of Puerto Rico
Forestry in Puerto Rico